Al'Asayl Cycling Team was a professional women's cycling team based in the United Arab Emirates, which competes in elite road bicycle racing events such as the UCI Women's World Tour.

Roster

Continental & National Championships
2018
 African Track (Individual Pursuit), Ebtissam Zayed
 African Track (Keirin), Ebtissam Zayed
 African Track (Team Pursuit), Ebtissam Zayed
 African Track (Team Sprint), Ebtissam Zayed
 African Track (Points race), Ebtissam Zayed
 African Track (Scratch race), Ebtissam Zayed
 African Track (Individual Sprint), Ebtissam Zayed
 Uzbekistan Track (Omnium), Renata Baymetova
 Uzbekistan Road Race, Ekaterina Knebeleva
 Uzbekistan Time Trial, Renata Baymetova

References

UCI Women's Teams
Cycling teams based in the United Arab Emirates
Cycling teams established in 2018